The Naxi language of southwestern China may be written in the syllabic geba script. There is also a Naxi tradition of pictographic symbols called dongba; this may sometimes be glossed with geba for clarification, since a dongba text may be intelligible only to its author. 

A Latin alphabet was developed for Naxi in the 20th century.

External links
Dr. Richard S. Cook, Naxi Pictographic and Syllabographic Scripts: Research notes toward a Unicode encoding of Naxi
Naxi Manuscript Collection at the Library of Congress
Naxi scripts at Omniglot
World Digital Library presentation of NZD185: Romance and Love-Related Ceremonies. Library of Congress. Primary source 19th and 20th century manuscripts from the Naxi people, Yunnan Province, China; only pictographic writing system still in use anywhere in the world.

Writing systems
Naxi language